The women's 55 kg competition at the 2019 World Weightlifting Championships was held on 19 and 20 September 2019.

Schedule

Medalists

Records

 Sukanya Srisurat's world records were rescinded in February 2020.

Results

New records

References

Results 

Women's 55 kg
2019 in women's weightlifting